Chipmunk Basic is a freeware interpreter for the BASIC programming language maintained by Ron Nicholson.

Chipmunk basic was originally developed for the Macintosh and has been ported to Linux and Microsoft Windows. The "windowed" Macintosh version includes a wide variety of graphics drawing commands. It also has object-oriented capabilities.

The current version of Chipmunk Basic (and its spinoff products for Palm OS, cBasPad and HotPaw BASIC) was based on a public domain, Pascal implementation by David Gillespie.

In January 2015, a Cocoa version was released that may lack features from the older Carbon-based OS X port. The most recent release is Version 1.368.2118, published Aug 31, 2019.

References

External links and/or references
Ron's Basic Programming and Chipmunk Basic Home Page
public domain source code for the original Chipmunk Basic
Category:Chipmunk Basic Tasks implemented in Chipmunk Basic on rosettacode.org

BASIC interpreters
Free compilers and interpreters
BASIC programming language family